The Flattop Mountain Trail, also known as the Grand Trail or the Big Trail, was built in 1925 in Rocky Mountain National Park in the Larimer County portion of the U.S. state of Colorado. Built in 1925, and rehabilitated in 1940 with Civilian Conservation Corps labor, it is listed on the National Register of Historic Places. The trail begins at 9500 feet of elevation at Bear Lake and climbs Flattop Mountain to a maximum elevation of 12,324 feet on the Continental Divide.

See also
National Register of Historic Places listings in Larimer County, Colorado

References

Park buildings and structures on the National Register of Historic Places in Colorado
Protected areas of Larimer County, Colorado
National Register of Historic Places in Rocky Mountain National Park
Civilian Conservation Corps in Colorado
Hiking trails in Colorado
National Register of Historic Places in Larimer County, Colorado